Bukulti is a neighbourhood of Riga, the capital of Latvia, located in the northeastern part of the Vidzeme Suburb.

Demographics 
As of 2013, a survey was taken with residents of the neighbourhood and 62% said they enjoyed their life in Bukulti. 51% of surveyees claimed the best part about the area was the Baltezers Canal.

History 
Early mentions of the settlement come from the 12th and 13th century. The earliest one dates to 1297, when a mill named Neiermīle mill (which was closed in 1894) was built by the Livonian Order. Later, the Livonian Order built Ādaži Castle.

Highways and railways 
In 1837, the Riga-Neiermīle highway started operating. In 1858, this road was added to the Saint Petersburg–Warsaw railway. In 1889, the Riga-Pskov railway was opened.

Landmarks

Ādaži Castle 
The Ādaži Castle was one of the many buildings created by the Livonian Order. However, it was burnt down 1559 (along with the mill), during the Livonian War. After the end of the war in 1586, the castle was rebuilt. It was destroyed again in 1624, and yet again in 1656 during the Second Northern War, but was rebuilt yet again.

Neiermīle mill 
The Neiermīle mill was opened in 1297 by the Livonian Order, and it was destroyed in 1559 and rebuilt in 1586. The mill was forced to close in 1894 due to the fact that the mill pond was flooding the nearby crops.

References 

Neighbourhoods in Riga